Direct costs are costs which are directly accountable to a cost object (such as a particular project, facility, function or product). Direct cost is the nomenclature used in accounting. The equivalent nomenclature in economics is specific cost. By contrast, a joint cost is a cost incurred in the production or delivery of multiple products or product lines. For instance, in civil aviation, substantial costs of a flight (pilots, fuel, wear and tear on the plane, landing and takeoff fees) are a joint cost between carrying passengers and carrying freight, and underlie economies of scope across passenger and freight services. By contrast, some costs are specific to the services, for instance, meals and flight attendants are specific costs of carrying passengers.

Direct costs are directly attributable to the object. In construction, the costs of materials, labor, equipment, etc., and all directly involved efforts or expenses for the cost object are direct costs. In manufacturing or other non-construction industries, the portion of operating costs which is directly assignable to a specific product or process is a direct cost. Direct costs are those for activities or services that benefit specific projects, for example salaries for project staff and materials required for a particular project. Because these activities are easily traced to projects, their costs are usually charged to projects on an item-by-item basis.

The economics term for the same concept is specific cost.

Direct costs typically include:
Direct materials used in manufacturing
Direct labour
Direct expenses, e.g. a royalty payment to a patent holder for a specific production process

References

Accounting